Independence Square, formerly Republic Square or Square of the Republic is the central town square of Podgorica, Montenegro. It is located in Nova Varoš (lit. "New Town"), which is the administrative and socio-cultural heart of the city. The square covers an area of 5.000 square metres. Both the city library "Radosav Ljumović", and the state gallery "Art", are located in the square.

Location

The square is bordered by Ulica Slobode (Freedom street) to the east, and Njegoševa ulica (Njegoš's street) to the west. Both Njegoševa and Slobode street are newly renovated pedestrian zones - with Ulica Slobode also being a popular shopping street. Bokeška and Vučedolska street create the square's northern and southern borders, respectively.
A pedestrian passage connects the Republic Square to Podgorica's City Hall and the Montenegrin National Theatre building.

History
Trg Republike was until 2006 known as Trg Ivana Milutinovića (Ivan Milutinović square) - a famous Montenegrin communist politician, military general and national hero. In 2006, the year of the Montenegrin independence, the square underwent a massive reconstruction. It was widened, paved, a big central fountain was constructed and the area was turned into a car-free zone. The square was decorated with colonnades, palm trees and water channels. The whole project cost around 2.5 million Euros.

References

Gallery

Squares in Podgorica
Tourist attractions in Podgorica